"Oasis" is a 1988 single written by Marcus Miller and Mark Stephens and recorded by Roberta Flack.  The title track off her 1988 album of the same name, the single was her first to chart on the Hot Black Singles chart in four years, peaking at number one on the Hot Black Singles chart for one week.  The single was the first time in ten years that Roberta Flack made the top spot.  "Oasis" did not chart on the Hot 100.

Charts

Weekly charts

Year-end charts

References

1988 singles
Roberta Flack songs
1988 songs
Songs written by Marcus Miller
Atlantic Records singles